Danny Whitehall (born 8 October 1995) is an English professional footballer who plays for Eastleigh as a forward.

Career
Born in Liverpool, Whitehall spent his early career with Liverpool and Rochdale. He joined Rochdale at under-18 level following his release from Liverpool.

He began his senior career with  Southport, moving to Marine in September 2014. He moved on to Prescot Cables in November 2014.

Whitehall then spent time in the United States, playing college soccer for SIU Edwardsville Cougars and Hastings College, and at club level for Chattanooga FC and Bugeaters FC. At Hastings he won a number of awards and set several records, scoring 93 goals in 75 games.

He returned to England in July 2019 with Maidenhead United, moving to Scottish club Kilmarnock in July 2020 on a six-month contract. He made his debut as a substitute against Hibernian on 1 August 2020.
On 8 January 2021, Whitehall extended his contract at Kilmarnock, signing a new deal until the end of the season. He left Kilmarnock at the end of the 2020–21 season.

In August 2021 he signed for Eastleigh.

Personal life
His father Steve Whitehall was also a footballer.

Career statistics

References

1995 births
Living people
English footballers
Liverpool F.C. players
Rochdale A.F.C. players
Southport F.C. players
Marine F.C. players
Prescot Cables F.C. players
SIU Edwardsville Cougars men's soccer players
Southern Illinois University Edwardsville alumni
Hastings College alumni
Bugeaters FC players
Chattanooga FC players
Maidenhead United F.C. players
Kilmarnock F.C. players
Eastleigh F.C. players
National League (English football) players
Northern Premier League players
National Premier Soccer League players
United Premier Soccer League players
Scottish Professional Football League players
Association football forwards
English expatriate footballers
English expatriates in the United States
Expatriate soccer players in the United States